is a 1960 Japanese film directed by Nagisa Ōshima. It is an intensely political film both in subject matter (Zengakuren opposition in 1950 and 1960 to the Anpo treaty) and in thematic concerns such as political memory and the interpersonal dynamics of social movements.

Plot 
In 1960, in the aftermath of the Anpo Protests against the US-Japan Security Treaty, uninvited guests interrupt the wedding ceremony between Nozawa, a journalist and former student radical of the 1950s, and Reiko, a current activist. They accuse the couple and assembled guests of forgetting their political commitments, invoking a tortured exploration of unresolved conflicts of a decade ago, when they were swept up in the student demonstrations.  In flashbacks, personal and political wounds are reopened, focused on Nozawa's subjective experiences in both 1950 and 1960. Two characters, one dead by suicide, the other now a Stalinist politician, are the subject of greatest scrutiny. The memory of Takao, a young student who committed suicide after letting a "spy" free, is reconstructed as a criticism of the authoritarian leadership of the Zengakuren of 1950. Nakayawa, former student leader now Communist functionary, is castigated for his role in the tragedy and his possession of Misako, a much desired female student. Other forgotten comrades from 1950 and fresh from the bloody demonstrations of 1960 are invoked as political and personal challenges.  In the end, night and fog envelops the guests as they stand immobile to the stilted speech of the unchanged Nakayawa: memory has been invoked, but it is unclear whether or not anything has changed.

Cast 
 Fumio Watanabe as Nozawa
 Masahiko Tsugawa as Ôta
 Miyuki Kuwano as Harada
 Hiroshi Akutagawa as Utagawa
 Noriko Ujiie as Utagawa's wife
Kei Sato
Rokko Toura

Production 
In 1948 the Zengakuren was formed, mobilizing Japanese students against the first Anpo treaty with the United States. This is the time period detailed in flashbacks, during which Nozawa, Nakayama, Misako, Takao, and Takumi were active. At the time, the Zengakuren was dominated by the Japanese Communist Party, represented in the film by the dogmatic leadership of Nakayama. Although resistance to the treaty failed in 1950, a new generation of student activists in 1960 challenged its renewal with massive street demonstrations, which once again ended in failure. This is Reiko's generation, and the demonstrations covered by Nozawa.  The Zengakuren of this period tried to assert its independence from the Japanese Communist Party, and subsequently fractured into several organizations that continued to retain the name. Night and Fog in Japan, with extensive political dialogue peppered with Marxist rhetoric, tries to make sense of political defeat and the reconciliation of these two generations. Although the marriage of Nozawa and Reiko seems to suggest the possibility of reconciliation, Nakayama looms large as the imposition of forced forgetting and the denial of reflection in favor of Party orthodoxy. Director Nagisa Ōshima clearly was critical of Stalinism and the failure of political reflection. This pessimistic assessment pervades the film (Ōshima had been involved in, and sympathized with, student movements himself), especially in the portrayal of personal motivations in political movements.

Release 
For its time, Night and Fog in Japan was amazingly daring, formally and politically. Ōshima received the funding and creative latitude as part of Shochiku's strategy of promoting films by several young directors they called the Shochiku-Ofuna New Wave. Three days after it was released, the film was abruptly pulled by the studio in the wake of Japanese Socialist Party politician Inejiro Asanuma's assassination by far right student Otoya Yamaguchi. In a blistering statement, Ōshima protested what he saw as the politically motivated censorship of his bold film. In this response, he expressed faith in the potential of the audience to receive controversial political films, taking issue with the political repression of the film industry and critics. Ōshima's political commitments to the struggles depicted in the film are confirmed here, as he claimed "my film is the weapon of the people's struggle," and, of the resistance to censorship: "that is the voice of the people demanding that the future of the Japanese film be directly tied to their own future."

Reception 
Commentators on Night and Fog in Japan have noted its formal innovation, especially its theatricality. Maureen Turim describes, in addition to innovative long take and shot sequences reminiscent of Kenji Mizoguchi, a new filmic theatricality. Spatial restriction, lighting, color, and gesture figure in it, but most importantly it is the way spoken lines and confrontations are ordered by camera movement and shot, so that "the cinema becomes a device for redefining theatrical language." Dana Polan sees the film as part of a broader element of Ōshima's cinema in which political meaning emerges "as process between screen and spectator." For example, in the ten-minute opening shot, camera movement and the symmetry of the wedding ceremony suggests a political stability threatened by the fog outside and the tracking shot that introduces the uninvited guests- destabilizing both composition and ideological certainty. More than just narratively showing political process, Ōshima's filmic technique demands the spectator reflect on the political and personal implications of form and character.

See also 

 Night and fog, 1956 French short documentary after which Oshima’s film was titled

Sources

External links
 
 

1960 films
Films directed by Nagisa Ōshima
1960s Japanese-language films
Shochiku films
Japanese political films
1960s political films
1960s Japanese films